The 1978 NSL Cup Final was the second NSL Cup Final, the final match of the 1978 NSL Cup. It was played at Perry Park in Brisbane, Australia, on 8 October 1978, contested by Brisbane City and Adelaide City. Brisbane won the match 2–1.

Background
Brisbane City entered the second NSL Cup Final having won the inaugural cup on penalties. In 1977, Adelaide had been eliminated by local rival and eventual losing semi-finalist West Adelaide.

A draw was held the week before the final to decide the venue, with Perry Park hosting for the second year in a row.

Route to the final

Brisbane City

Adelaide City

Match
A Barry Kelso strike saw the Brisbane team take the lead in the 28th minute. Adelaide City soon equalised, with Zoran Matić scoring in the 31st minute. Frank Pimblett sealed the win for Brisbane City in the 77th minute.

Details

References

NSL Cup Finals
October 1978 sports events in Australia
NSL Cup Final 1978
Soccer in Brisbane
Adelaide City FC
Brisbane City FC